Aliabad (also Romanized as ‘Alīābād) is a village in Hesar-e Valiyeasr Rural District, Central District, Avaj County, Qazvin Province, Iran. At the 2006 census, its population was 143, in 50 families.

Aliabad suffered severely in the 2002 Bou'in-Zahra earthquake.

References 

Populated places in Avaj County